This list of botanical gardens and arboretums in Idaho is intended to include all significant botanical gardens and arboretums in the U.S. state of Idaho

See also
List of botanical gardens and arboretums in the United States

References 

 
Arboreta in Idaho
botanical gardens and arboretums in Idaho